Stadio Giuseppe Moccagatta is a multi-use stadium in Alessandria, Italy.  It is used mostly for football matches and is the home ground of U.S. Alessandria Calcio 1912 as well as of Juventus Next Gen. The stadium holds 5,827 people.

The stadium was named after , an Italian businessman, politician and sports executive from Alessandria.

References

External links 
Photos at Worldstadiums.com

Giuseppe Moccagatta
Giuseppe
U.S. Alessandria Calcio 1912
Juventus Next Gen